Spring Garden Street Bridge is a highway bridge in Philadelphia, Pennsylvania. It crosses the Schuylkill River below Fairmount Dam and connects West Philadelphia to the Philadelphia Museum of Art and Benjamin Franklin Parkway. It is the fourth bridge at this location.

1st bridge: The Colossus

As early as 1693, a ferry operated, crossing the Schuylkill River at Fairmount, the hill on which the Philadelphia Museum of Art now stands. Being upstream of the others, this was called the Upper Ferry.

For the Upper Ferry site, bridgebuilder Louis Wernwag designed "The Colossus", the longest single-span wooden bridge in the United States. Construction began in April 1812, and it opened on January 7, 1813. Also called the "Colossus of Fairmount," the "Upper Ferry Bridge," and the "Lancaster Schuylkill Bridge," the toll bridge was part of the Philadelphia and Lancaster Turnpike. It was destroyed by fire on September 1, 1838.

Thomas Birch painted at least two views of the bridge, and one of them was made into an 1813 engraving by Jacob J. Plocher. This "Upper Ferry Bridge" engraving was copied frequently on Staffordshire china.

2nd bridge: Wire Bridge at Fairmount

Five miles upstream from Fairmount, iron manufacturers Josiah White and Erksine Hazard built a wire-cable footbridge in 1816.

Twenty-five years later, permanent wire-cable suspension bridges had been built in France and Switzerland. To replace "The Colossus," Charles Ellet, Jr. designed the first major wire-cable suspension bridge in the United States. The  "Wire Bridge at Fairmount" was commissioned by the City of Philadelphia, and opened to traffic on January 2, 1842. It had no toll, and stood for over thirty years.

Ellet would go on to design the  Wheeling Suspension Bridge (1847–49); and the first Niagara Falls Suspension Bridge (1847–48), which was abandoned before completion.

3rd bridge: Callowhill Street Bridge

The Callowhill Street Bridge was designed by Jacob H. Linville, engineer, and built by the Keystone Bridge Company, 1874–75. The arches between the decks were decorative and removed circa 1900; the ornate railings were removed by 1910. It was demolished in 1964.

4th bridge: Spring Garden Street Bridge

The current bridge was designed by Richard Wisniewski of Philadelphia, and completed in 1965. It carries West Spring Garden Street over the Pennsylvania Railroad lines, the Schuylkill Expressway, the Schuylkill River, and the Schuylkill River Trail. The West River Drive Bridge crosses diagonally beneath it, carrying the Dr. Martin Luther King, Jr., Drive over the Schuylkill River.

See also
List of bridges documented by the Historic American Engineering Record in Pennsylvania
List of crossings of the Schuylkill River
Spring Garden Street Tunnel

Notes

References

External links

Bridges in Philadelphia
Bridges over the Schuylkill River
Bridges completed in 1813
Bridges completed in 1842
Bridges completed in 1875
Bridges completed in 1965
Historic American Engineering Record in Philadelphia
Road bridges in Pennsylvania
Former toll bridges in Pennsylvania
1842 establishments in Pennsylvania